The girls’ trampoline competition at the 2018 Summer Youth Olympics was held on 8 and 14 October at the America Pavilion in Buenos Aires, Argentina.

Results

Qualification

Final

References

External links
Qualification Results 
Final Results 

Gymnastics at the 2018 Summer Youth Olympics